Agnibilékrou is a town in eastern Ivory Coast. It is a sub-prefecture of and seat of Agnibilékrou Department in Indénié-Djuablin Region, Comoé District. Agnibilékrou is also a commune.
In 2021, the population of the sub-prefecture of Agnibilékrou was 99,501.

Villages
The thirteen villages of the sub-prefecture of Agnibilékrou and their population in 2014 are:

Notable residents
Kouassi Brou: Ivorian Olympic swimmer

Sister city
Agnibilékrou is twinned with Lafayette, Louisiana, United States.

References

Sub-prefectures of Indénié-Djuablin
Communes of Indénié-Djuablin

sv:Elfenbenskusten#Geografi